Liaquat Ali Lucky (born 13 January 1957) is a Bangladeshi actor, director, singer, composer and cultural organiser. He has been the director general of Shilpakala Academy since April 2011. He was awarded Ekushey Padak by the Government of Bangladesh in 2019. As of 2018, he has acted in 58 theatre plays and directed 82 plays.

Early life and career
Lucky was born to Sheikh Sadek Ali and Majeda Begum on 13 January 1957 in Nawabganj Upazila, Dhaka. He completed his bachelor's and master's in English literature from the University of Dhaka.

Awards
 Dhaka University Gold Medal (1984)
 The Unique Group Gold Medal (2000)
 The Face of Bengal Award (2004)
 Honorary Cultural Envoy of Japan Award (2004) 
 Munier Chowdhury Medal (2013)
 Poet Mahbub ul Alam Chowdhury Award (2015) 
 Journalist Bojlur Rahman Memorial Medal (2015)
 Dr Bhupen Hazarika Byatikrom International Award (2018)

References

Living people
1957 births
People from Dhaka
University of Dhaka alumni
Recipients of the Ekushey Padak